Ajax (2021 population: 126,666) is a town in Durham Region in Southern Ontario, Canada, located in the eastern part of the Greater Toronto Area.

History

The indigenous peoples were active in the watersheds of the Duffins Creek and the Carruthers Creek since the Archaic period (7000-1000 BCE), although they did not build any major settlements in the area, presumably because of the poor navigability of these streams. In 1760, French Sulpician missionaries from Ganatsekwyagon reached Duffins Creek area, but did not settle there.

After the British conquest of New France in 1760, the area became part of the Pickering Township. Mike Duffin, an Irish fur trader, is the earliest known European to have settled in the area, in the 1770s. The conversion of the main local trail into the Kingston Road in 1799 contributed to increased settlement in what is now Ajax. In the first half of the 19th century, the Pickering Village, now a neighbourhood in Ajax, evolved as the major population centre of the Township, supported by a timber and agricultural boom. In 1807, Timothy Rogers led Quaker families to settle in the area, and built saw and grist mills on the banks of the Duffins Creek. The War of 1812 increased military traffic on the Kingston Road, resulting in a better-maintained road, and leading to further development of the area.

In the mid-19th century, Audley, a smaller community, emerged as a stopover on the route to the port of Whitby. By the 20th century, much of the area of present-day Ajax had been converted into farmland. In 1926, James Tuckett of Toronto bought lakeshore farmland, and started the development of the Pickering Beach cottage community, which later became a permanent settlement.

After the start of the World War II in 1939, the Government of Canada expropriated most of the farmland in what is now southern part of Ajax, to establish the Defence Industries Limited Pickering Works munitions plant. Operated by Defence Industries Limited (DIL), the government-owned plant employed workers from different parts of Canada. The plant site, along with the residences and the facilities established for the workers, evolved into a self-contained community, whose residents called it a "village". As part of a contest, the DIL employee Frank Holroyd suggested the name "Ajax" for the community, in honour of the British warship HMS Ajax which had fought against the powerful Nazi battleship Admiral Graf Spee at the Battle of the River Plate in 1939.

After the plant shut down in 1945, the site was used as a war surplus warehouse and sales outlet, a University of Toronto campus (1946-1949), and a holding camp for war refugees from Europe (1949-1953). The government mandated the Canada Mortgage and Housing Corporation (CMHC) to develop the site and its surrounding area into a modern industrial town. George Finley, the CMHC manager of the area, planned new housing subdivisions, commercial centres, and industrial areas.

In 1950, Ajax was incorporated as an Improvement District, a form of local administration managed by the Lieutenant Governor's appointees. The Improvement District Board created the community's first by-laws and hired employees for the local administration. In August 1954, as a result of a campaign by the Ajax Citizens Association, the Ontario Municipal Board declared Ajax a town, granting it full municipal status. The first town  council members were elected on 11 December 1954, and assumed office on 1 January 1955. The first mayor of the town was Benjamin de Forest Bayly, better known as Pat Bayly.

In the early 1970s, the Metropolitan Toronto and Region Conservation Authority (MTRCA) acquired much of the land along the lakeshore. In the Pickering Beach area, several homes, a church, and a school were demolished to make way for a parkland.

On 1 January 1974, Ajax became a part of the newly formed Regional Municipality of Durham, which manages functions common to multiple municipalities in the region. The boundaries of the town of Ajax were expanded to include several areas of the former Pickering Township, including Pickering Village, Pickering Beach, and Audley.

Geography

Ajax is bordered to the west and north by the City of Pickering, to the east by the Town of Whitby and to the south by Lake Ontario.

Neighbourhoods

The town is made up of the following neighbourhoods:

 Applecroft
 Audley North
 Audley Road Business Area
 Audley South
 Carruthers Creek
 Carruthers Creek Business Area
 Central Employment Area
 Clover Ridge
 Deer Creek
 Discovery Bay
 Downtown
 Duffins Bay
 Duffins Crossing
 Hermitage
 Lake Vista
 Lakeside
 Meadow Ridge
 Memorial Village
 Midtown
 Nottingham
 Pickering Beach
 Riverside
 Salem Business Area
 Salem Heights
 South Greenwood
 Southwood
 Village, better known as Pickering Village
 Westney Heights

Downtown Ajax
Called "Pat Bayly Square", it will provide residential, retail and office space, as well as a civic square and civic facility. Pat Bayly Square opened in September 2018.

Local government

Ajax is governed by an elected town Council consisting of a Mayor, and local Councillors representing each of the town's three wards. In addition, three Regional Councillors each represent a ward each. The Mayor and the Regional Councillors sit on both Ajax Town Council and Durham Region Council.

The members of the council elected in the 2022 municipal election are:

Mayor: Shaun Collier

Regional Councillors:
Ward 1: Marilyn Crawford
Ward 2: Sterling Lee
Ward 3: Joanne Dies

Councillors:

Ward 1: Rob Tyler-Morin
Ward 2: Nancy Henry
Ward 3: Lisa Bower

In the past, Council has sat for a three-year term, but the Ontario Legislature increased the length of municipal council terms in Ontario to four years, in 2006. The last municipal election was held in 2018. In 2018, Ajax Council shifted from two regional councillors and four local councillors to three regional councillors and three local councillors.

Demographics 

According to the 2021 Census, the median age is 38.4 years, around 3 years less than the national average of 41.6 years; 18.8% of the population is under 15 years of age while 13.1% are 65 and over.

According to the 2016 Census, among those 25 to 64 years old, the highest levels of education are as follows: 66.6% of people have a post-secondary certificate, diploma, or degree, 25.3% have a high school diploma or equivalency certificate, and 8.2% have no certificate, diploma, or degree.

As of 2021, the median value of dwellings in Ajax is $850,000 compared to the provincial median value of $700,496, and the national figure of $472,000.

As of 2021, 92% of Ajax's residents are Canadian citizens, with 42% being immigrants. 8% of the population immigrated between 2011 and 2021. The main places of birth of the immigrant population are India (13%), Sri Lanka (11%), Jamaica (10%), Philippines (8%), Pakistan (8%), Guyana (6%), United Kingdom (5%), Trinidad and Tobago (4%), Afghanistan (4%), and China (3%). Among the 5010 recent immigrants, who immigrated between 2016 and 2021, 34% were from India.

Ethnicity 
According to the 2021 Census, the main self-reported ethnic and cultural origins included English (12%), Indian (10%), Canadian (9%), Irish (9%), Scottish (9%), Jamaican (6%), Filipino (5%), Pakistani (5%), Sri Lankan (4%), Chinese (4%), and Tamil (4%). 65% of the town's population comprises visible minority, with the biggest of these groups being South Asian (26.2%), Black (16.8%), Filipino (5.3%), Chinese (3%), West Asian (3%), Arab (2%), and Latin American (1.3%). 3% of the people identify as belonging to multiple visible minority groups. Those with only indigenous ancestry make up 0.23% of the population, while those with mixed indigenous and non-indigenous ancestry make up 1.03% of the population. Ajax has the highest Black population percentage of any major Canadian municipality (population above 100,000).

Note: Totals greater than 100% due to multiple origin responses.

Religion 

According to the 2021 Census, the largest religion in Ajax is Christianity (50.83%), with Catholics making up the largest group (22.25%). The next most reported religions are Islam (14.08%) and Hinduism (11.62%). 20.77% of the population reported no religious affiliation.

Language 
According to the 2021 census, English is the most commonly understood language in the town, with 97.97% of the people knowing it. It is also the most common mother tongue: 64.79% of the people consider English as their only mother tongue, plus 5.75% consider English and another language as their mother tongues. Other common languages include the following:

Economy

In 1945, with the closing of D.I.L., there was no industry within the town, but in 1949, Dowty Aerospace started operations in Ajax. By 1969, major employers included Volkswagen Canada, DuPont, Paintplas, Ajax Textile, AEG Bayly Engineering and many others.

Shopping was virtually non-existent in the mid-1940s, but by 1970 major shopping centres such as Ajax Plaza, Harwood Place Mall and Clover Ridge Plaza were constructed. The 1980s saw an expansion of retail shopping malls to include Discovery Bay Plaza, Transit Square, Baywood Plaza, Westney Heights Plaza and most recently the Durham Centre at Harwood Avenue and Kingston Road.

The 1970s saw the beginning of many physical changes to the face of Ajax. New subdivisions spread over vacant land in central Ajax. The early 1980s brought extensive development to the southern part of Ajax with large, upscale housing units constructed along Lake Driveway.

The recession of the early 1980s did not stop residential development in Ajax. Westney Heights started north of Highway 2 and offered home buyers low interest rate mortgages while interest rates were then at an all-time high of 18% to 20%. Development north of Highway 2 stretched from Church Street in Pickering Village to Harwood Avenue, with the Millers Creek development south of the highway down to the edge of Highway 401.

Ajax Downs
Ajax Downs is a casino that is located on 50 Alexander's Crossing, near the intersection of Kingston Road and Audley Road. It has been controversial since the announcement of the Durham Live casino in 2018. The Ontario premier Doug Ford had promised to keep the Ajax Downs open after the completion of the casino. In 2022, The Durham Live casino was completed. Although it is referred to as the Pickering Casino, it lies on the border of the two small cities. This marks the first major casino operation in the Greater Toronto Area.

Infrastructure

Health care
The Ajax and Pickering General Hospital first opened in 1954 with 38 adult and children's beds. It was expanded to 50 beds in 1958 and a major expansion to 127 beds took place in 1964. The emergency and outpatient services were expanded in 1975. The large growth of population in the Town has prompted a further expansion. Approval was granted in the fall of 1990 to further expand. In 1999, the Hospital merged with Centenary Health Centre in Scarborough to become part of the Rouge Valley Health System. Construction on a $60 million expansion began in 2007, although that has been marred by the highly controversial closure of the 3 West Mental Health ward in 2008, which was originally to be part of the expansion.

Emergency services
The Durham Regional Police police Ajax from a station in Pickering. Durham Region provides Ambulance/emergency medical services. Ajax Fire & Emergency Services provides firefighting services from three fire stations.

Transportation

Ajax GO Station is served by GO Transit's Lakeshore East line, with service from Toronto and Oshawa.

In 1973, the Town of Ajax conducted a survey of potential transit ridership in Ajax. This led to the creation of Ajax Transit with bus service beginning in 1973 under a contract with Charterways Transportation Limited, which operated service using a fleet of school buses, with heaviest ridership between the Pickering Beach area and downtown Ajax.

In the late 1970s, the town brought the operations in house and began operations on the Elm, Duffins, and Beach routes, which exist to this day. In the early 1980s, the Harwood, Westney Heights, and Village routes began service. Service on the Puckrin route began in the late 1980s.

In 2001, Ajax Transit and the neighbouring Pickering Transit were amalgamated into the Ajax Pickering Transit Authority (APTA), which operated under the joint ownership and oversight of Ajax and Pickering.

In 2006, APTA was amalgamated into Durham Region Transit along with the other municipal transit services in Durham Region.

Road transportation in Ajax is dominated by Highway 401, which runs east–west through the town, dividing it in half. Access to Highway 401 both east and west is available via Westney Road and Salem Road. Only four streets allow transportation from the north end of town to the south end of town by crossing over or under Highway 401. These streets are (from west to east) Church Street, Westney Road, Harwood Avenue and Salem Road. Lakeridge Road crosses the highway, but it is traditionally held to be the border between the towns of Ajax and Whitby. Notable streets that run parallel to the highway are (from north to south) Taunton Road, Rossland Road, Kingston Road (Highway 2) and Bayly Street. At Salem Road is where Highway 401 narrows to three lanes each way, causing a severe traffic bottleneck eastbound during rush hours and special holidays due to increased travel to Ottawa and Montreal.

The closest international airport to Ajax is Toronto Pearson International Airport, located 50 kilometres to the west in Mississauga.

Education

Ajax is served by the Durham District School Board and the Durham Catholic District School Board. There are five high schools and several elementary schools. Two of the high schools are Catholic schools: Notre Dame Catholic Secondary School and Archbishop Denis O'Connor Catholic High School. The other three are the public secondary schools: Ajax High School, J. Clarke Richardson Collegiate and Pickering High School.

Culture

Music and dance 

During 1955–1962, the Ajax Recreational Committee ran regular dances for the town's teenagers. The Saturday night dances, called "Ajax Teen Town", were held at the Ajax Community Centre, and were attended by as many as 500 teenagers at its peak. The Community Centre burnt down in 1960s, and the event attendance gradually declined, as music styles changed and as the members grew up.

For a short period beginning in the 1990s, Ajax became notable for its punk musicians, with the Maclean's magazine calling it the "punk-rock capital of Canada" in 2003. After the success of Sum 41, record labels began looking for upcoming artists at the local shows in the Durham region. Several other bands and artists from Ajax achieved popularity, including Closet Monster, Not by Choice, Matt Brann and Jesse Colburn (members of Avril Lavigne's back-up band). According to writer Alan Cross, punk became popular in Ajax as the local teens kept themselves busy with music, finding not much else to do in a small town. Chameleon Café (110 Dowty Road), an auto body garage converted into a music venue, became a popular spot for local bands during the mid-to-late 1990s, with hundreds of teens gathering there on weekends. According to producer Greig Nori, the popularity of Chameleon Café (which closed in 2001) and the proximity of Ajax to Toronto (where teens could attend major punk band concerts) helped the music scene in the town.

Sports 

The members of the Ajax Aquatic Club, established in 1973, have included the Olympic medalists Anne Ottenbrite and Lori Melien. The Ajax Budokan Judo Club was also established in 1973, with 20 members, most of them high school students. Its members have included judokas Jessica Klimkait, Craig Weldon, Sandra Greaves, and Kevin Doherty. The Ajax Acros Gymnastic Club was formed as a feeder club in 1974, with 60 children. Lori Strong, who has won multiple medals at the Commonwealth Games, started her training at this club.

The Ajax-Pickering Rock (2003-2010) was a local box lacrosse team that played in the Ontario Lacrosse Association Senior "B" League during 2003–2010. In 2010, it was promoted to Senior "A" Major Series Lacrosse league, and played under the name Ajax Rock (2011-2012). The team faced challenges in attracting players and fan base because of competition from other teams in the Durham Region. In 2013, it moved from Ajax to the newly constructed Toronto Rock Athletic Centre (TRAC) in Oakville, and re-branded itself as Oakville Rock.

In 2022, the Ajax Pickering Minor Hockey Association was formed after the merger of the Ajax Minor Hockey (Ajax Knights), Pickering Minor Hockey (Pickering Panthers), and Ajax-Pickering Raiders; the team retains the name "Raiders". Ajax Spartans Minor Baseball Association (ASMBA) is a local minor league baseball team.

Ajax Wanderers, established in 1949, is the oldest rugby union club in Ontario. Its members have included Dave Moonlight of Whitby.

Other sports clubs in the town include the Ajax Soccer Club, Ajax United, Ajax-Pickering Dolphins (football), Ajax Pickering Ringette Association, Ajax Cricket Club, Ajax Scuba Club, and Ajax Skating Club. Ajax Ice Waves, a synchronized skating team of the Ajax Skating Club, won several local competitions in Ontario in the 2010s.

Notable people and groups

Toya Alexis, musician, Canadian Idol finalist
Charlotte Arnold, actress
Benjamin deForest Bayly, inventor
Jeff Beukeboom, retired NHL player
Ruby Bhatia, Indian-Canadian VJ, television show host, and actress
Ryan Blanchet, touring car racer
Boi-1da, hip hop producer
Matt Brann, musician
Brendan Canning, musician
Munro Chambers, actor
Nichelle Prince, women's soccer player and Olympian
Candace Chapman, women's soccer player and Olympian
Closet Monster, punk rock band
Christian Corbet, painter, sculptor and forensic artist
Derek Cornelius, professional soccer player
Joe Dickson, MPP and owner of Dickson Printing
Janet Ecker, former Ontario Minister of Finance
Akeem Foster, CFL football player
Keith Godding, CFL football player
Glenn Healy, former NHL goaltender
Kyle Johnson, professional basketball player and Olympian; grew up in Ajax
The Johnstones, ska band
Kaza Kajami-Keane, professional basketball player, and Canadian national team player
Rabindranath Maharaj, novelist
Nam Nguyen, national champion figure skater
Not by Choice, punk rock band
Emmett O'Connor, professional association football (soccer) player
Kim Phuc, subject of a famous photo from the Vietnam War
John Saunders, sports journalist for ESPN and ABC
Corey Sevier, actor
Ken Shaw, CTV Toronto news anchor
Nathan Shepherd, NFL football player
Devin Shore, current NHL forward
Rene Soetens, former Progressive Conservative MP
Sum 41, punk rock band
T-Minus, hip hop and R&B producer
Jessica Tyler, actress
Nigel Wilson, retired MLB player
Renee Young, WWE on-air personality

See also
List of municipalities in Ontario

Notes

References

Bibliography 

 
 
 
 
 
 
 
 
The Pictorial History of Ajax, 1941/1972, Ajax Historical Board, 1972
Past Years in Pickering, William R. Wood, Toronto, 1911
The Village of Pickering 1800–1970, Corporation of the Village of Pickering, 1970
The Pickering Story, William Archie McKay, 1961

External links

 
Populated places on Lake Ontario in Canada
Lower-tier municipalities in Ontario
Populated places established in 1941
Towns in Ontario
1941 establishments in Canada